Monford Merrill "Monte" Irvin (February 25, 1919 – January 11, 2016) was an American left fielder and right fielder in the Negro leagues and Major League Baseball (MLB) who played with the Newark Eagles (1938–1942, 1946–1948), New York Giants (1949–1955) and Chicago Cubs (1956). He grew up in New Jersey and was a standout football player at Lincoln University. Irvin left Lincoln to spend several seasons in Negro league baseball. His career was interrupted by military service from 1943 to 1945.

When he joined the New York Giants, Irvin became one of the earliest African-American MLB players. He played in two World Series for the Giants. When future Hall of Famer Willie Mays joined the Giants in 1951, Irvin was asked to mentor him. He was inducted into the Baseball Hall of Fame in 1973. After his playing career, Irvin was a baseball scout and held an administrative role with the MLB commissioner's office.

At the time of his death, Irvin was the oldest living former Negro Leagues player, New York Giant and Chicago Cub. He lived in a retirement community in Houston before his death.

Early life
Irvin was born February 25, 1919, in Haleburg, Alabama, the eighth of 13 children, and brother of fellow Negro leaguer Cal Irvin. As a child, he moved with his family to Orange, New Jersey. At Orange High School, he starred in four sports, earning a total of 16 varsity letters and setting a state record in the javelin throw. Irvin played baseball for the Orange Triangles, the local semiprofessional team, and he credited its coach with giving him an activity that helped him to stay out of trouble. He was offered a football scholarship to the University of Michigan, but he had to turn it down because he did not have enough money to move to Ann Arbor.

Irvin attended Lincoln University and was a star football player. However, he had disagreements with his coach and he found that he could not remain on his athletic scholarship and pursue pre-dentistry studies. As his frustration mounted, Irvin began to be recruited by Negro league baseball teams.

Negro league and Mexican League career
Irvin played for the Newark Eagles of the Negro National League in 1938. Larry Doby, the first player to break the color barrier in the American League, was Irvin's double play partner with Newark at one time. After hitting for high batting averages of .422 and .396 (1940–41), Irvin asked for a raise before the 1942 season. When that was denied, he left the Negro leagues for the Mexican League, where he won a triple crown; he had a .397 batting average and 20 home runs in 63 games.

World War II
Following the 1942 Mexican League season, Irvin was drafted into military service. Joining the army's GS Engineers, 1313th Battalion, for the next three years, Irvin was deployed to England, France, and Belgium, and he served in the Battle of the Bulge. Irvin said that while many black soldiers had been treated badly by their white counterparts, the situation improved for black soldiers as many white soldiers realized the contradiction in an oppressed group being sent to Europe to fight for the oppressed people in other countries. Irvin's military service left him with ringing in the ears, which affected his coordination.

Return to baseball
After World War II, Irvin was approached by Brooklyn Dodgers executive Branch Rickey about being signed for the major leagues, but Irvin felt he was not ready to play at that level so soon after leaving the service. The Newark Eagles business manager, Effa Manley, would not let Rickey sign Irvin without compensation. Rickey had already obtained Jackie Robinson without paying for his rights to his Negro league clubs. Said Irvin,

 ... from a purely business standpoint, Mrs. Manley felt that Branch Rickey was obligated to compensate her for my contract. That position probably delayed my entry into the major leagues ... Mrs. Manley told Rickey that he had taken Don Newcombe for no money but she wasn't going to let him take me without some compensation. Furthermore, if he tried to do it, she would sue and fight him in court ... Rickey contacted her to say he was no longer interested released me ... the Giants picked up my contract ...

Irvin earned MVP honors in the 1945–46 Puerto Rican Winter League. He returned to the Newark Eagles in 1946 to lead his team to a league pennant. Irvin won his second batting championship, hitting .401, and was instrumental in beating the Kansas City Monarchs in a seven-game Negro League World Series, batting .462 with three home runs. He was a five-time Negro League All-Star (1941, 1946–1948, including two games in 1946). He spent the winter of 1948–49 in Cuba.

MLB career
In 1949, the New York Giants paid $5,000 for Irvin's contract. He was one of the first black players to be signed, as Jackie Robinson had only broken the MLB color line in 1947. Assigned to Jersey City of the International League, Irvin batted .373. He debuted with the Giants on July 8, 1949, as a pinch hitter. Back with Jersey City in 1950, he was called up after hitting .510 with ten home runs in 18 games. Irvin batted .299 for the Giants that season, playing first base and the outfield.

In 1951, Irvin sparked the Giants' miraculous comeback to overtake the Dodgers in the pennant race, batting .312 with 24 homers and a league-best 121 runs batted in (RBI), en route to the World Series (he went 11–24 for .458). In the third game of the playoff between the Giants and Dodgers, Irvin popped out in the bottom of the ninth inning before Bobby Thomson hit the Shot Heard 'Round the World. That year Irvin teamed with Hank Thompson and Willie Mays to form the first all-black outfield in the majors. Later, he finished third in the NL's MVP voting.

During that season, Giants manager Leo Durocher asked Irvin to serve as a mentor for Mays, who had been called up to the team in May. Mays later said, "In my time, when I was coming up, you had to have some kind of guidance. And Monte was like my brother ... I couldn't go anywhere without him, especially on the road ... It was just a treat to be around him. I didn't understand life in New York until I met Monte. He knew everything about what was going on and he protected me dearly." Irvin later replied, "I did that for two years and in the third year he started showing me around."

Irvin suffered a broken ankle during a spring training game in Denver in 1952, jamming his ankle on third base while sliding. "It was a horrible thing to see," reported Mays. However, Irvin returned in time to be named to his only Major League Baseball All-Star Game in 1952. He appeared in only 46 games that season, hitting .310 with four home runs and 21 RBI. Irvin hit .329 with 21 home runs and 97 RBI in 1953, finishing 15th in the league MVP voting. The following season, he hit .262 with 19 home runs and 64 RBI, with the Giants winning the pennant and facing the Cleveland Indians in the 1954 World Series. Irvin was in left field when Mays, playing center field, made "The Catch" on a deep drive off the bat of Vic Wertz in Game 1. The Giants went on to win the Series in four games, with Irvin collecting two hits in nine at bats.

In 1955, Irvin had been sent down to the minor leagues, where he hit 14 home runs in 75 games for the Minneapolis Millers. The Chicago Cubs signed him before the 1956 season. The team said that he would compete with Hank Sauer for a starting position in left field. Irvin appeared in 111 games for the Cubs that year, hitting .271 with 15 home runs.

A back injury led to Irvin's retirement as a player in 1957. He sustained the injury during spring training that year and only appeared in four minor league games for the Los Angeles Angels of the Pacific Coast League. In his major league career, Irvin batted .293, with 99 home runs, 443 RBI, 366 runs scored, 731 hits, 97 doubles, 31 triples, and 28 stolen bases, with 351 walks for a .383 on-base percentage, and 1187 total bases for a .475 slugging average in 764 games played. Defensively, Irvin recorded a .981 fielding percentage.

Later life
Monte appeared on an episode of To Tell The Truth dated May 22, 1961, in which he impersonated a judo champion.

After retiring, Irvin worked as a representative for the Rheingold beer company, and later as a scout for the New York Mets from 1967 to 1968. He was named an MLB public relations specialist for the commissioner's office under Bowie Kuhn in 1968. The appointment made him the first black executive in professional baseball. He was elected to the Mexican Professional Baseball Hall of Fame in 1972. The next year, he was inducted into the Baseball Hall of Fame, primarily on the basis of his play in the Negro leagues.

In 1974, Kuhn was present in Cincinnati when Hank Aaron tied Babe Ruth's record of 714 career home runs. When the team came back to Atlanta, Kuhn sent Irvin in his place, so Kuhn was not present for Aaron's 715th home run. Even as late as 1980, Aaron was so angry at Kuhn that he did not attend an event where Kuhn was to present him with an award.

Irvin stepped down from his role with the commissioner when Kuhn announced his retirement in 1984. He retired to Homosassa, Florida, but he accepted an MLB role involving special projects and appearances.

On May 16, 2006, Orange Park in the city of Orange, New Jersey was renamed Monte Irvin Park, in his honor.

On June 26, 2010, the San Francisco Giants officially retired his number 20 uniform. He was joined by fellow Hall of Famers Willie Mays, Willie McCovey, Juan Marichal, Gaylord Perry and Orlando Cepeda in the pre-game ceremony. He later joined those same Giants Hall of Famers in throwing out the ceremonial first pitch of Game 1 of 2010 World Series.  In 2015, he was presented a 2014 World Series ring by Giants executives and later joined the Giants in visiting the White House.

In 2013, the Bob Feller Act of Valor Award honored Irvin as one of 37 Baseball Hall of Fame members for his service in the United States Army during World War II.

On January 11, 2016, Irvin died of natural causes in Houston a month before his 97th birthday. At the time of his death, Irvin was the oldest living African American to have played in the major leagues, as well as the oldest living member of a World Series-winning team. Prior to his death, he lived in a retirement community in Houston. He also served on the Veterans Committee of the Hall of Fame. The Giants wore a patch in his memory for the 2016 season, a black circle with an orange outline with "Monte" on top of his number 20, to be worn on the left sleeve.

On October 19, 2016, a life-sized bronze statue of Irvin was dedicated in Monte Irvin Park in Orange, New Jersey.

In 2021, Irvin was inducted into the New Jersey Hall of Fame.

Career statistics

Negro leagues
The first official statistics for the Negro leagues were compiled as part of a statistical study sponsored by the National Baseball Hall of Fame and supervised by Larry Lester and Dick Clark, in which a research team collected statistics from thousands of box-scores of league-sanctioned games.  The first results from this study were the statistics for Negro league Hall of Famers elected before 2006, which were published in  Shades of Glory by Lawrence D. Hogan.  These statistics include  the official Negro league statistics for Monte Irvin:

Source:

Mexican League

Source:

See also

List of first black Major League Baseball players
List of Negro league baseball players who played in Major League Baseball
List of Major League Baseball annual runs batted in leaders

Notes

References

Further reading

Articles
United Press. "Irvin's Injury Dims Giant Hopes; Star Breaks Ankle, May Be Sidelined for Rest of Season". The Pittsburgh Press. April 3, 1952.
Fraley, Oscar. "Ankle Injured, Monte Irvin Has Plentitude Of Troubles But Still Hopes For Batting Crown". Madeira Daily News-Tribune. August 14, 1953.
"'That Boy's So Full of Play'; Two close friends of Willie Mays talk about frisky personality of newly legendary Giant". Life. September 13, 1954. pp. 133–134, 137-138, 141.
 Trimble, Joe. Irvin Makes Long Road to Hall of Fame". Daily News. February 8, 1973. 
 Richman, Milton (UPI). "Monte Couldn't Fool His Wife". The Desert Sun. February 8, 1973.

Books
Irvin, Monte; Riley, James A. (1996). Monte Irvin: Nice Guys Finish First. 
Irvin, Monte; Pepe, Phil (2007).  Few and Chosen: Defining Negro League Greatness. Chicago, IL: Triumph Books. .
Anton, Todd; Nowlin, Bill, ed. (2008). When Baseball Went to War. Chicago, IL: Triumph Books. pp. 117-180. .

External links

 and Seamheads
cmgww.com – Official website

1919 births
2016 deaths
African-American baseball players
Almendares (baseball) players
American expatriate baseball players in Cuba
American expatriate baseball players in Mexico
American male javelin throwers
Azules de Veracruz players
Baseball players from Alabama
Baseball players from New Jersey
Chicago Cubs players
Jersey City Giants players
Lincoln University (Pennsylvania) alumni
Los Angeles Angels (minor league) players
Major League Baseball left fielders
Major League Baseball players with retired numbers
Mexican Baseball Hall of Fame inductees
Minneapolis Millers (baseball) players
National League All-Stars
National Baseball Hall of Fame inductees
National League RBI champions
New York Giants (NL) players
New York Mets scouts
Newark Eagles players
Orange High School (New Jersey) alumni
People from Henry County, Alabama
People from Orange, New Jersey
Sportspeople from Essex County, New Jersey
Sportspeople from Manhattan
Baseball players from New York City
United States Army personnel of World War II
United States Army soldiers
Track and field athletes from New York City
21st-century African-American people